Venus and the Sun is a 2011 short film based on myths from Ovid's Metamorphoses directed by Adam Randall and starring Keeley Hazell, Will Smith, and Ukweili Roach. It was written by Reuben Grove and produced by Andy Brunskill.

The film premieres in London on 10 March 2011 at the Rich Mix Cinema, Shoreditch

Cast
 Keeley Hazell as herself/Venus
 Will Smith as Simon
 Ukweli Roach as Adam

iPhone app
A free app for the film is currently available to download from the App store containing mini games and the trailer. Users will then be able to pay for the full version which contains the film on the day of release.

See also

Cultural influence of Metamorphoses

References

External links
 
 
 FHM review
 Keeleys return on Zoo
 Film Profile on Ask Men
 The Film Review.

British short films
2011 films
Films scored by Stephen Warbeck
Films based on Metamorphoses
2010s English-language films